Robert Bostock may refer to:

 Robert Bostock (1784–1847), English sea merchant
 Robert Bostock (cleric) (1607–1640), former Archdeacon of Suffolk
 Robert Bostock (slave trader, born 1743), English slave trader